The board of directors Annual Report is an album by vocal group The Mills Brothers with pianist and bandleader Count Basie and His Orchestra featuring performances recorded in 1968 and released on the Dot label. The album follows Basie's 1967 collaboration with The Mills Brothers The board of directors.

Reception

AllMusic awarded the album 4 stars stating "As usual, it's the supposedly timely material that sounds dated, while the old favorites remain timeless. Nevertheless, this is an excellent match-up that should have been tried earlier and more often".

Track listing
 "Gentle on My Mind" (John Hartford) – 2:39
 "Cherry" (Don Redman, Ray Gilbert) – 3:23
 "You Never Miss the Water Till the Well Runs Dry" (Arthur Kent, Paul Secon) – 2:49
 "Glow Worm" (Paul Lincke, Lilla Cayley Robinson, Johnny Mercer) – 2:21
 "Sent for You Yesterday and Here You Come Today" (Count Basie, Eddie Durham, Jimmy Rushing) – 3:34
 "Sunny" (Bobby Hebb) – 3:28
 "I'll Be Around" (Alec Wilder) – 2:49
 "Cielito Lindo" (John Redmond, James Cavanaugh) – 2:17
 "Blue and Sentimental" (Basie, Jerry Livingston, Mack David) – 3:30
 "Every Day" (Basie) – 2:54

Personnel 
The Mills Brothers – vocals
Count Basie – piano
Oscar Brashear, Gene Goe, Sonny Cohn – trumpet
Al Aarons – trumpet, flugelhorn
Richard Boone, Harlan Floyd, Grover Mitchell – trombone
Bill Hughes – bass trombone
Bobby Plater, Marshal Royal – alto saxophone
Eddie "Lockjaw" Davis, Eric Dixon – tenor saxophone
Charlie Fowlkes – baritone saxophone
Freddie Green – guitar
Norman Keenan  – bass
Harold Jones – drums
Chico O'Farrill – arranger

References 

1968 albums
Count Basie Orchestra albums
Dot Records albums
Albums produced by Teddy Reig
Albums arranged by Chico O'Farrill
Mills Brothers albums